The 2022 CAF Women's Champions League UNIFFAC Qualifiers is the 2nd edition of CAF Women's Champions League UNIFFAC Qualifiers  tournament organised by the UNIFFAC for the women's clubs of association nations. This edition was originally to  be held from 20 August  to 4 September 2022 in the Cameroonian capital Yaoundé.  However on 11 August the competition was postponed indefinitely following the lack of guarantee from the government of the Republic of Cameroon, the new dates and hosts will be fixed by UNIFFAC.  On 24 August 2022 it was announced that Equatorial Guinea will host the tournament starting from 10 september. 
The winners of the tournament qualified for the 2022 CAF Women's Champions League.

Venues
Matches are held at the Estadio de Malabo.

Participating teams
The following five teams will contest in the qualifying tournament.
 

 Associations which did not enter a team

Draw
The draw for this edition of the tournament was held on 6 september 2022  in Cairo,Egypt.

Qualifying tournament

First round

CECUS FC won on walkover after AC Colombe failed to appear on the pitch.

Second round

Final

Statistics

Goalscorers

References

2022 CAF Women's Champions League
Women's Champions League
CAF